Patania iopasalis is a moth of the family Crambidae. It was described by Francis Walker in 1859. It is found in Myanmar, India, Papua New Guinea Thailand, Sri Lanka, Borneo in Indonesia, Taiwan, China and Philippines.

References

Moths described in 1859
Moths of Asia
Moths of Japan
Spilomelinae
Taxa named by Francis Walker (entomologist)